Rosanna Zambon (born July 3, 1950, in Schio, Italy) is an Italian singer.

Biography
She is best known for her work in Japan with the duo Hide & Rosanna. She subsequently became a TV personality with her own Italian cuisine show.

Discography
粋なうわさ A PRETTY RUMOR/橋本淳･筒美京平ゴールデン･アルバム (stylish rumor A PRETTY RUMOR /  love of color of tears) Hashimoto Atsushi Kyohei Tsutsumi Golden Album (1969.7.10, JPS-5182) * newly recorded song (cover of Chiyo Okumura)
イタリーの休日 (holiday of Italy) (1969.11.25, JDX-32)
デュエット／ヒデとロザンナの世界 (DUET! DUET! DUET! world of Rosanna and Hiden duet) (1971.11.10, JDX-57)
愛の伝説 (legend of love) (1972.06.25, JDX-75)
旅の宿 (inn of travel BEST SELECTIONS OF HIDE & ROSSANNA) (1970.12.25, JDX-46)
追想 (retrospect) (1975, L-10094R)
WALKING AGAIN　(1977年, L-10066R)
愛のハーモニー (Harmony of Love) (1979, DVR-11001)
愛はいつまでも (love forever) (1989/5/25, 29L2-74)

Selected Songs
愛の奇跡 (Miracle of love) (1968.10.15, P-42)
粋なうわさ (Stylish rumor) (1969.4.15, P-58)
ローマの奇跡 (Miracle of Rome) (1969.8.25, P-74)
笑ってごらん子供のように (As you can see children laughing) (1970.1.25, P-83)
愛は傷つきやすく (Love is vulnerable) (1970.5.25, P-93)

Kōhaku Uta Gassen Appearances

References

External links
Cream company official site
Hide & Rosanna Single Collection

1950 births
Living people
Italian songwriters
Italian women singers
People from Schio
Italian emigrants to Japan
Italian expatriates in Japan